William Dean or Deane (died 28 August 1588) was an English Roman Catholic priest. He is one of the Catholic martyrs, beatified in 1929.

Life
Son of Thomas B. of Grassington West Riding of Yorkshire William Dean attended schools in Leeds and Clitheroe.

Dean was matriculated sizar from Magdalene College, Cambridge in 1575 and was admitted pensioner at Caius College, Cambridge in November 1577, aged 20. He then became a minister. In 1581, he was reconciled to the Catholic faith by the seminary priest Thomas Alfield.

That same year he studied at Reims and was ordained priest at Soissons, 21 December 1581, together with the martyrs George Haydock and Robert Nutter. Their ordination coincided with the time that the news of Edmund Campion's death reached the college.

Dean said his first Mass 9 January and left for England 25 January 1582. He was probably being tracked the whole time and was arrested 21 February and sent to Newgate prison and subjected to torture. In April 1584 he was moved to The Clink. He was banished with a number of other priests in early 1585, put ashore on the coast of Normandy, and threatened with death if he dared to go back to England. Nevertheless, in November he returned to his mission work there and was again arrested and confined to Gatehouse Prison. He was tried, and condemned for his priesthood on 22 August 1588.

The failure of the Spanish Armada brought about a fierce anti-Catholic persecution and some twenty-seven Catholics were executed that year. Six new gibbets were erected in London, it is said at the Earl of Leicester's instigation, and Dean, who had been condemned with five other priests and four laymen, was the first to suffer on the gallows erected at Mile End. With him died a layman, Henry Webley, for relieving and assisting him.

At his execution Dean tried to speak to the people, but he was struck on the head and gagged.

Henry Webley
Henry Webley was born in Gloucester around 1558. From there he went to London, where he assisted William Dean during the priest's brief mission in the city. By 1586, the ports were being closely watched by both government officials and government spies. In April of that year, Webley was seized on board a ship at Chichester bound for France and sent to the Marshalsea, where he remained for two years. His crimes included being reconciled to the Catholic religion, making his confession to Fr. Dean, and aiding and assisting the priest. His trial was held in the latter part of August 1588 at the Old Bailey, but appears to have been merely a formality since those sent for trial were those selected for execution. Webley was hanged, along with Dean, at Mile End Green on 28 August 1588.

Edward Shelley
Edward Shelley of Warminghurst, Sussex, and East Smithfield, London (son of Edward Shelley, of Warminghurst, a Master of the Household of the sovereign, and the settlor in "Shelley's case", and Joan, daughter of Paul Eden, of Penshurst, Kent). His grandfather was Sir John Shelley of Michelgrove near Arundel. He was apparently uncle by marriage to Benjamin Norton, afterwards one of the seven vicars of Dr. Richard Smith.

Aged 50 or 60, Shelley was already in The Clink for his religion in April, 1584. He was condemned for keeping a book called My Lord Leicester's Commonwealth and for having assisted the Venerable William Dean. He was hanged at Tyburn 30 August 1588.

References

Attribution
 The entry cites:
Richard Challoner, Missionary Priests (1741), I, 209;

1588 deaths
16th-century English Roman Catholic priests
English beatified people
16th-century venerated Christians
Year of birth unknown
16th-century Roman Catholic martyrs
Alumni of Magdalene College, Cambridge
People executed by England and Wales by hanging
One Hundred and Seven Martyrs of England and Wales